Daniel Fischer is a former member of the Wisconsin State Assembly.

Biography
Fischer was born on March 4, 1952, in Reedsville, Wisconsin. He graduated from the University of Wisconsin-Oshkosh and is married with one child.

Career
Fischer was first elected to the Assembly in 1976. He is a Democrat.

References

People from Reedsville, Wisconsin
Democratic Party members of the Wisconsin State Assembly
University of Wisconsin–Oshkosh alumni
1952 births
Living people